Bültsee is a lake in Rendsburg-Eckernförde, Schleswig-Holstein, Germany.

Lakes of Schleswig-Holstein
Nature reserves in Schleswig-Holstein